José Benito Lamas (Montevideo, 12 January 1787 - 9 May 1857) was a Roman Catholic priest from the Banda Oriental.

Biography
He was ordained in the Franciscan Order and studied theology and philosophy. He was a notable patriot during the fight for freedom in colonial times; José Artigas appointed him military chaplain and educator.

In 1833, in the newly created Republic of Uruguay, Lamas was appointed lecturer of philosophy.

He was an interest candidate for first bishop of Montevideo, but he died in 1857, during a yellow fever epidemic.

Family
His sister Josefa married politician Santiago Vázquez. His brother Luis María Lamas was a notable politician in Uruguay; his grand-nephew Luis Lamas was Intendente in Rosario, Argentina.

References

1787 births
1857 deaths
People from Montevideo
Uruguayan people of Galician descent
19th-century Uruguayan Roman Catholic priests
Uruguayan Franciscans
Apostolic vicars of Uruguay
Deaths from yellow fever